Frederick Henry Jackson (January 27, 1938 – February 28, 2003) was a Canadian politician. He served in the Legislative Assembly of British Columbia from 1991 to 1996, as a NDP member for the constituency of Kamloops-North Thompson.

References

British Columbia New Democratic Party MLAs
1938 births
2003 deaths